Mannari is an Italian surname. Notable people with the surname include:

Graziano Mannari (born 1969), Italian footballer
Guido Mannari (1944–1988), Italian actor

Italian-language surnames